Albert Edgar Ritchie,  (December 20, 1916 – January 24, 2002) was a Canadian diplomat.

Early life and education 
Born in Andover, New Brunswick, he received a Bachelor of Arts degree in 1938 from Mount Allison University. A Rhodes scholar, he received an additional Bachelor of Arts from the University of Oxford in 1940.

Career 
In 1944, he joined the Minister of Foreign Affairs and worked in Washington, D.C.

He resigned in 1946 to become Special Assistant to the Assistant Secretary-General for Economic Affairs Department of the United Nations. He re-joined the Minister of Foreign Affairs in 1948 and was posted in London. In 1959, he was appointed Assistant Under-Secretary of State for External Affairs. He served as Deputy Under Secretary of State for External Affairs from August 1964 until July 1966. From 1966 to 1970, he was the Canadian ambassador to the United States. From 1970 to 1974, he held the top job in Canada's foreign service as Under Secretary of State for External Affairs. From 1976 to 1980, he was the Canadian ambassador to Ireland.

In 1973 he received the Government of Canada Public Service Outstanding Achievement Award. In 1975 he was made a Companion of the Order of Canada.

Death 
Ritchie died on January 24, 2002, in Ottawa, Ontario.

References
 

1916 births
2002 deaths
Ambassadors of Canada to the United States
Companions of the Order of Canada
Members of the United Church of Canada
Canadian Rhodes Scholars
Mount Allison University alumni
People from Perth-Andover
Ambassadors of Canada to Ireland
20th-century Australian public servants
Canadian officials of the United Nations